Becker Farmhouse is a historic home located at Duanesburg in Schenectady County, in the U.S. state of New York. It was built about 1850 by noted master carpenter Alexander Delos "Boss" Jones. It is a two-story, three-bay frame building with a hipped roof in a combined late Greek Revival / Italianate architecture style.  It has a one-story addition with a gable roof.  It features a cupola.  Also on the property are four barns and two sheds.

The property was covered in a 1984 study of Duanesburg historical resources. The property was also covered in a study of Boss Jones TR It was listed on the National Register of Historic Places in 1984.

References

Houses on the National Register of Historic Places in New York (state)
Houses in Schenectady County, New York
Greek Revival houses in New York (state)
Houses completed in 1850
National Register of Historic Places in Schenectady County, New York